Josef Richard Rozkošný (21 September 1833 – 3 June 1913) was a Czech composer and pianist.  He was born and died in Prague, where he studied music.

Works

Operas
 Ave Maria, libretto V. Trappl; unperformed, lost (1855 or 1856)
 Mikuláš (Nicholas) 1870
 Svatojanské proudy (St John's Rapids, after the rapids on the Vltava) also called Vltavská víla (The Spirit of the Vltava) 1871; performed in German as St. Johannes Stromschnellen
 Záviš z Falkenštejna (Zavis of Falkenstein) 1877
 Mladí pytláci (The Young Poachers) 1877, libretto Jindřich Hanuš Böhm, unperformed, lost
 Alchymista (The Alchemist) 1880, libretto also by Böhm, also unperformed, lost
 Popelka (Cinderella) 1885
 Krakonoš (The Rübezahl Spirit) 1889
 Stoja 1894
 Satanela also Satanella 1898
 Černé jezero (Black Lake) also Šumavská víla (The Spirit of the Šumava Forest) 1906
 Rusalka (unfinished)

Selected recordings
 Svatojanské proudy, scene from Act 1 recorded in Czech version by singers including Ivan Kusnjer, as the count, in 1987 for Czech Radio Plzen; conductor Vít Micka.

References

1833 births
1913 deaths
Czech classical composers
Czech male classical composers
Czech classical pianists
Musicians from Prague
Czech opera composers
Male opera composers
19th-century classical pianists
Male classical pianists
19th-century Czech male musicians